"Don't Let Him Steal Your Heart Away" is a song by Phil Collins from his second solo album Hello, I Must Be Going!. The song was the third single released from the album in the UK and charted at No. 45. It is notable for its 3D sleeve. The song was written around 1978-1979 during sessions for Face Value.

It was eventually released to adult contemporary stations in the USA in 2004, from his Love Songs compilation album, reaching #5.

Critical reception
On its release, Simon Tebbutt of Record Mirror wrote, "if the last single led you to believe the bloke had any get up and go, this will assure that it has all got up and gone. This is a song for elderly gentlemen who sit in exclusive clubs sipping brandy and mithering on about the good old days of the Sixties and Seventies." David Hepworth of Smash Hits expressed opposite opinion. He called song "marvellous". As per him "Phil Collins’ steady improvement as a songwriter is highlighted here by the way he effectively welds three distinct musical sections into a piece that’s guaranteed the become a late night radio regular."

Track listing

7": Virgin / VS 572 (UK) 
 "Don't Let Him Steal Your Heart Away"
 "Thunder and Lightning"

12": Virgin / VS 572-12 (UK)
 "Don't Let Him Steal Your Heart Away"
 "And So to F" (Live)

Personnel 
 Phil Collins – acoustic piano, drums, vocals
 Daryl Stuermer – guitars 
 John Giblin – bass
 Martyn Ford – string arrangements and conductor 
 Gavyn Wright – orchestra leader
 The Mountain Fjord Orchestra – strings

Charts

References

1983 singles
Phil Collins songs
Virgin Records singles
Song recordings produced by Hugh Padgham
Songs written by Phil Collins
Song recordings produced by Phil Collins
1982 songs
Atlantic Records singles